Rodrigo Ezequiel Herrera (born 2 August 2000) is an Argentine professional footballer who plays as a defensive midfielder for San Martín de Tucumán, on loan from Defensa y Justicia.

Career
Herrera is a product of the Defensa y Justicia youth system. He made the move into their first-team squad in December 2020 under manager Hernán Crespo, initially appearing on the substitute's bench for a Copa Sudamericana round of sixteen second leg victory away to Vasco da Gama on 3 December. On 6 December, Herrera made his senior debut in a defeat away to Independiente in the Copa de la Liga Profesional first group stage; featuring for the full duration at the Estadio Libertadores de América.

Career statistics
.

Notes

References

External links

2000 births
Living people
People from Florencio Varela Partido
Argentine footballers
Association football midfielders
Argentine Primera División players
Defensa y Justicia footballers
San Martín de Tucumán footballers
Sportspeople from Buenos Aires Province